Maryna Oleksandrivna Lisohor (born 11 May 1983) is a Ukrainian cross-country skier. On 22 February 2014, she tested positive for trimetazidine and was expelled from the 2014 Winter Olympics.

Cross-country skiing results
All results are sourced from the International Ski Federation (FIS).

Olympic Games

World Championships

World Cup

Season standings

References

External links
 

1983 births
Living people
Ukrainian female cross-country skiers
Olympic cross-country skiers of Ukraine
Cross-country skiers at the 2014 Winter Olympics
Place of birth missing (living people)
Doping cases in cross-country skiing
Ukrainian sportspeople in doping cases